The 2019–20 Sacred Heart Pioneers men's basketball team represented Sacred Heart University during the 2019–20 NCAA Division I men's basketball season. This was the Pioneers' 21st season of NCAA Division I basketball, all played in the Northeast Conference. The Pioneers were led by seventh-year head coach Anthony Latina and played their home games at the William H. Pitt Center in Fairfield, Connecticut. They finished the season 20–13, 12–6 in NEC play to finish in fourth place. They defeated Mount St. Mary's in the quarterfinals of the NEC tournament before losing in the semifinals to Saint Francis (PA). With 20 wins, they were a candidate for postseason play. However, all postseason tournaments were cancelled amid the COVID-19 pandemic.

Previous season 
The Pioneers finished the 2018–19 season 15–17, 11–7 in NEC play to finish in third place. As the 3-seed they lost to 6-seed LIU Brooklyn in the quarterfinals of the NEC tournament.

Roster

Schedule and results

|-
!colspan=9 style=| Non-conference regular season

  
|-
!colspan=9 style=| NEC Regular season

  
|-
!colspan=9 style=| NEC tournament

source

References 

Sacred Heart Pioneers men's basketball seasons
Sacred Heart
Sacred Heart Pioneers men's b
Sacred Heart Pioneers men's b